FK Pardubice is a Czech football club located in the city of Pardubice. It currently plays in the Czech First League.

The club is the successor of TJ Tesla Pardubice, which merged with FC Loko Pardubice in 2008.

History
The club advanced to the Bohemian Football League in 2010 from the Czech Fourth Division. In 2012 the club was again promoted, this time to the Czech 2. Liga, after finishing second in the 2011–12 Bohemian Football League. Winners MFK Chrudim were not promoted due to their stadium not meeting league requirements.

Players

Current squad
.

Out on loan

History in domestic competitions

 Seasons spent at Level 1 of the football league system: 1
 Seasons spent at Level 2 of the football league system: 8
 Seasons spent at Level 3 of the football league system: 2
 Seasons spent at Level 4 of the football league system: 2

Czech Republic

References

External links 
  
 Supporters 

Football clubs in the Czech Republic
Association football clubs established in 2008
Sport in Pardubice
2008 establishments in the Czech Republic
FK Pardubice